George Majeroni, also known as Giorgio Majeroni, (1877–1924) was a stage and screen actor. His starring roles in silent films included My Lady Incog opposite Hazel Dawn.

Majeroni was born in Melbourne, Australia and was part of a family of actors. His older brother Mario Majeroni was born in Sardinia and also came to the U.S.

His first performance in the U.S. was in 1905. He had a wife and two children. Majeroni died at Saranac Lake in New York's Adirondacks.

Theater
For the Term of His Natural Life, adaptation
Laugh, Clown, Laugh
An adaptation of The Kreutzer Sonata
Top o' th' World
The Claw (play)
The Pink Lady
Diplomacy (1914)

Filmography
The Sign of the Cross (1914)
Bella Donna (1915)
The Eternal City (1915)
Diplomacy (1916)
My Lady Incog (1916)
The Feud Girl (1916)
As in a Looking Glass (1916)
Patria (serial) (1917)
Who's Your Neighbor? (1917)
 Stranded in Arcady (1917)
 Tangled Lives (1918)
The Caillaux Case (1918)
 The Green God (1918)
Hoarded Assets (1918)
The Woman the Germans Shot (1918)
The Invisible Bond (1919)
Marriage For Convenience (1919)
 In Honor's Web (1919)
What Women Will Do (1921)
 How Women Love (1922)

References

External links

1877 births
1924 deaths
Australian emigrants to the United States
American male stage actors
American male film actors